is a professional Japanese baseball pitcher for the Hiroshima Toyo Carp of Nippon Professional Baseball (NPB).

Career
Kuribayashi was selected by the Hiroshima Toyo Carp with the team's first selection in the 2020 Nippon Professional Baseball draft. He made his NPB debut on March 27, 2021, pitching a scoreless inning with 2 strikeouts against the Chunichi Dragons. After recording a stellar 0.55 ERA in 33 appearances to begin the year, Kuribayashi was named an NPB All-Star for the first time in his career.

References

External links

 Career statistics - NPB.jp
 チームデータ 20 栗林 良吏 - 広島東洋カープ公式サイト 

1996 births
Living people
Baseball people from Aichi Prefecture
Meijo University alumni
Nippon Professional Baseball pitchers
Hiroshima Toyo Carp players
Nippon Professional Baseball Rookie of the Year Award winners
Baseball players at the 2020 Summer Olympics
Olympic baseball players of Japan
Olympic medalists in baseball
Olympic gold medalists for Japan
Medalists at the 2020 Summer Olympics